Lorena Gómez Pérez (born 12 April 1986 in Lleida) is a Spanish pop singer known artistically as Lorena.

She was the winner of TV's Spanish language's talent-search program fifth series of Operación Triunfo. In 2007, her debut album, Lorena was released under the Sony BMG label.

Biography

Early years 

She was born on 12 April 1986 in Lleida, Spain. She is the youngest daughter of Paco (police) and Mari (homemaker). She has two older sisters, Sonia and Gemma.

At age 8 performed in a stage for the first time and she never went down of it. For 14 years she was at the Casa de Andalucía of Lleida singing and dancing flamenco, sang in various benefit acts (always as a solo singer) and was component of a gospel choir where she studied vocal training.

In television, Operación Triunfo wasn't her first appearance, she was at age 10 in Menudas Estrellas and Menudo Show, at age 12 in Sabor a ti and at age 16 in Cerca de ti.

She also taken part in different singing competitions: in 2001 was finalist of the Benidorm International Song Festival, in 2003 won Operación Tremp and in 2004 was second in the Concurso Nacional de Coplas.

Operación Triunfo 2006

This program started on 8 October 2006 and, for four months, she was shut in an academy with an adjusted timetable of classes and rehearsals.

In the first part of the program, the show's favorite was chosen by the public, and the jury nominated to leave the academy. In this part, she was, every week, except one, between the four most voted by the public, and was the favorite in the gala (episode) 6. She was nominated by the jury one time, in the gala 9, but she was saved by the teachers.

In the second part of the program, the favorite was chosen by the jury, and the two less voted by the public fought a duel to not leave the academy. During this part, she was elected favorite by the jury 3 times, in the galas 11, 14 and 15. She fought a duel with Moritz in the gala 13 and was saved by the public with 62% of the votes.

In the final gala 16, on 26 January 2007, she was chosen winner of the program with a 50.7% of the votes of the public in front of her top rival, Daniel. For winning the 5th season of the show, Lorena got a record contract with the multinational Sony BMG "label".

Post Show – Debut album (2007): Lorena

Once finished the program, and after made the required interviews in television and press as winner of Operación Triunfo, she started the recording of her first album in Sony BMG. The recording of this album was made between February and March 2007 in the Estudios Filigrana at Córdoba, under the direction and production of Manuel Ruiz "Queco".

On 27 March 2007, two months after winning Operación Triunfo, this album, named Lorena was released, the album was an album of personal covers of greatest hits of international artists, with two new songs also included. The album entered and peaked at number 4 of the Spanish Top 100 Albums.

Two singles were released from the album: "Sin Medida" in March 2007 and "Otro Amor Vendrá" in July 2007. Lorena promoted these singles in television, radio and press (National and Autonomic); also she was invited to perform in several galas and events (as the Cup's Soccer Final in the Santiago Bernabeu Stadium or the Europride 2007 between others); and she appeared in the TV Series more viewed in Spain: Yo soy Bea.

She started the tour Adelante on 24 March 2007 with her mates in Operación Triunfo 2006. In this tour they performed songs of the TV program and their first single of their albums. The tour was composed of 11 concerts in big precincts in Lleida, Santander, Zaragoza, Madrid, Barcelona, València, Murcia, Fuerteventura, Málaga and Bilbao. The tour finished on 26 May 2007 in Bilbao.

In the summer of 2007 she made a mini-tour presenting the songs of her debut album. The tour started on 16 June 2007 in Lleida as supporting artist of David Bisbal. The tour was composed of 10 concerts in the provinces of Lleida, Lugo, Murcia, Málaga, Asturias, Barcelona, Madrid and Huesca. The tour finished on 12 October 2007 in Fraga (Huesca).

2008 – Second-album: De Pelicula
11 famous movie soundtracks of all time: Maniac, I've had the time of my life, I say a little prayer, I don't want to miss a thing, Eye of the tiger, Footloose, Up where we belong, If you could read my mind, Fame, Think and Save the best for last.

The lead off single is Maniac, which failed to make any impact on the charts, due to the low promotion given on radios and TV shows.

The album was released on 1 April 2008 in Spain, and peaked at a very disappointing #34 on the Spanish Albums Chart, due to the low promotion and the album is another cover-release. The album fell to #57 the following week, rising to #46 the fourth week.

2010 – Eurovision
Lorena competed in the pre-selection of the Spanish entry to the 2010 Eurovision Song Contest with her song, "Amor Magico" (Magical Love). She received the second-highest number of votes in the online voting poll and was put through to the final 10 'liveshows' Spain in the Eurovision Song Contest 2010. Lorena's song "Amor Magico" went on to finish in third place behind strong favorites "En Una Vida" by (Coral Segovia) and eventual winning song "Algo Pequenito" by (Daniel Diges).

2013–present (Career in Acting / third studio album)
Lorena flew to the States to begin work on her acting career and her highly anticipated third studio album. The new record "Esta Vez" will consist a full set of original compositions. The first single of the same name "Esta Vez" was released in 2013. The promo-only non-official second single "Bailar" was released in February 2015.

Filmography

Discography

Albums

Singles

Collaborations

References

External links

 Lorena's Official Site
 Lorena's Fans Club

Living people
1986 births
Singers from Catalonia
People from Lleida
Lorena
Operación Triunfo contestants
21st-century Spanish singers
21st-century Spanish women singers